1 Samuel 22 is the twenty-second chapter of the First Book of Samuel in the Old Testament of the Christian Bible or the first part of the Books of Samuel in the Hebrew Bible. According to Jewish tradition the book was attributed to the prophet Samuel, with additions by the prophets Gad and Nathan, but modern scholars view it as a composition of a number of independent texts of various ages from c. 630–540 BCE. This chapter contains the account of David's escape from Saul's repeated attempts to kill him and the massacre of the priests in Nob. This is within a section comprising 1 Samuel 16 to 2 Samuel 5 which records the rise of David as the king of Israel.

Text
This chapter was originally written in the Hebrew language. It is divided into 23 verses.

Textual witnesses
Some early manuscripts containing the text of this chapter in Hebrew are of the Masoretic Text tradition, which includes the Codex Cairensis (895), Aleppo Codex (10th century), and Codex Leningradensis (1008). Fragments containing parts of this chapter in Hebrew were found among the Dead Sea Scrolls including 4Q51 (4QSam; 100–50 BCE) with extant verses 10–11 and 4Q52 (4QSam; 250 BCE) with extant verses 8–9.

Extant ancient manuscripts of a translation into Koine Greek known as the Septuagint (originally was made in the last few centuries BCE) include Codex Vaticanus (B; B; 4th century) and Codex Alexandrinus (A; A; 5th century).

Old Testament references
: ; 
:

Places 

Adullam
Gibeah
Hereth 
Mizpah or Mizpeh in Moab
Nob
Ramah

David in Adullam and Moab (22:1–5)
David was now an outlaw (continued throughout chapters 26) and hid in Adullam, where he was joined by his family and 'all those who were deprived and embittered', so he became a leader of a group of 'malcontents'.

Verses 1–2
David therefore departed from there and escaped to the cave of Adullam. So when his brothers and all his father’s house heard it, they went down there to him. And everyone who was in distress, everyone who was in debt, and everyone who was discontented gathered to him. So he became captain over them. And there were about four hundred men with him."
"Adullam": was a 'cave' (according to Masoretic Text), which also functioned as a 'stronghold' (according to Septuagint; cf. verse 4), located to the south-west of Jerusalem in the Shephelah. The geographical condition of the wilderness around Adullam in Judah had long been a hideout of fugitives.

Verses 3–4
Then David went from there to Mizpah of Moab; and he said to the king of Moab, "Please let my father and mother come here with you, till I know what God will do for me." So he brought them before the king of Moab, and they dwelt with him all the time that David was in the stronghold."
Due to the uncertainty of his life as outlaw and how it would affect his family, David sought asylum for his parents in Moab, for some reasons: his ancestry connections with Moab through Ruth (Ruth 4:17–22), and the likely support from an enemy of Saul, who had defeated Moab in battle (1 Samuel 14:47). This action proved to be correct because Saul was very suspicious of any conspiracy and would kill anyone he suspected to do so, including their families (verses 8, 13).

Verse 5
Then the prophet Gad said to David, “Do not remain in the stronghold; depart, and go into the land of Judah.” So David departed and went into the forest of Hereth.
Gad: later became a court prophet (2 Samuel 24:11–19).
"Hereth" (KJV: "Hareth"): is a forested area in Judah, assumed to be on the border of the Philistine plain, in the southern part of Judah.

Massacre of the priests of Nob (22:6–23)
The sequel narrative to David's visit to Nob opened with Saul sitting in council at Gibeah (cf. 14:2) accusing the members of his own tribe ('you Benjaminites') of conspiracy and of not disclosing to him the pact between David and Jonathan (verse 8); therefore immediately isolated himself from his own clan. Doeg the Edomite, the 'chief of the shepherds' in 1 Samuel 21:7, now was titled 'in charge of Saul's servants' (KJV: "set over the servants of Saul"), reported Ahimelech's assistance to David by giving him bread and Goliath's sword. Ahimelech, who was called to come before Saul, protested his innocence by claiming that he only treated David as Saul's obedient servant and son-in-law without knowledge a change in David's status. No matter what, Saul commanded his servants to kill the priests, but they refused to obey, so Saul commanded Doeg, who being an Edomite dared to execute the entire priesthood of Nob and commit blood revenge on the whole city (verse 19). One priest, Abiathar son of Ahimelech son of Ahitub, escaped and attached himself to David, thereby fulfilling the prophecy of 2:27–36,  as well as securing for David the service of a priest with ephod (including "Urim and Thummim"; cf. 1 Samuel 23:9–12). The priest Abiathar remained with him as high priest until he was eventually banished by Solomon (1 Kings 2:26–27). In the end this narrative contrasts Saul, whose act of reprisal had lost for him the service of a priesthood, and David, who had access to YHWH through the only priest left.

Verses 9–10
Then answered Doeg the Edomite, who was set over the servants of Saul, and said, “I saw the son of Jesse going to Nob, to Ahimelech the son of Ahitub. And he inquired of the Lord for him, gave him provisions, and gave him the sword of Goliath the Philistine.”
The reference to Doeg the Edomite in 1 Samuel 21:7 becomes meaningful in the this part of narrative, which may add to the long-standing animosity between Israel and Edom (Genesis 25:25, 30; Numbers 20:1–21; Judges 3:7-11).

See also

Related Bible parts: 1 Samuel 17, 1 Samuel 18, 1 Samuel 20, 1 Samuel 21

Notes

References

Sources

Commentaries on Samuel

General

External links
 Jewish translations:
 Shmuel I - I Samuel - Chapter 22 (Judaica Press). Hebrew text and English translation [with Rashi's commentary] at Chabad.org
 Christian translations:
 Online Bible at GospelHall.org (ESV, KJV, Darby, American Standard Version, Bible in Basic English)
 1 Samuel chapter 22. Bible Gateway

22